Peiponen is a surname of Finnish origin. Notable people with the surname include:

Johanna Peiponen (born 1990), Finnish long-distance runner
Roni Peiponen (1997–2022), Finnish footballer

Finnish-language surnames